Aldus may refer to:

People
 Aldus Manutius, a Venetian publisher who popularized small personal volumes
 Aldus Manutius the Younger, grandson of Aldus Manutius
 Aldus Chapin Higgins (1872–1948), American lawyer and inventor
 Aldus Roger (1915–1999), American Cajun accordion player
 David Aldus  (born 1941), Welsh painter

Businesses
 Aldine Press, the printing office founded by Aldus Manutius
 Aldus Corporation, a software developer known for their desktop publishing software that was acquired by Adobe Inc.

Other
 Aldus (typeface), a typeface by Herman Zapf that is unrelated to the type of the Aldine Press